D'Amboise is a French surname meaning "of Amboise". Notable people with the surname include the following:

Charlotte d'Amboise, Broadway dancer and daughter of Jacques d'Amboise.
Christopher d'Amboise, former New York City Ballet principal dancer and son of Jacques d'Amboise. 

French-language surnames